Clásica a los Puertos de Guadarrama is a professional cycle road race held in the Sierra de Guadarrama, Spain in late August each year. The event was first run in 1978 and since 2005 it has been organised as a 1.1 event on the UCI Europe Tour

Winners

External links
Official website 

UCI Europe Tour races
Cycle races in Spain
Sport in the Community of Madrid
Recurring sporting events established in 1978
1978 establishments in Spain